The Noritidae, sometimes spelled Noritidea, is an extinct cephalopod family  of belonging to the ammonoid order Ceratitida and superfamily Noritoidea.

The Noritidae, which lived during the Early and Middle Triassic, are characterized by smooth, flat, discoidal shells with tabulate venters bordered by pronounced shoulders. Sutures are ceratitic with club-shaped saddles.

References 

 The Paleobiology Database
 Arkell et al. 1957, Mesozoic Ammonoidea Treatise on Invertebrate Paleontology

 
Ceratitida families
Early Triassic first appearances
Middle Triassic extinctions